Hav Abdur Rashid is a Pakistani former sports shooter. He competed in the 25 metre pistol event at the 1964 Summer Olympics.

References

External links
 

Year of birth missing (living people)
Possibly living people
Pakistani male sport shooters
Olympic shooters of Pakistan
Shooters at the 1964 Summer Olympics
Place of birth missing (living people)